Edwards Island is a river island in Wood County, Wisconsin. The island is on the Wisconsin River within Wisconsin Rapids city limits.

Edwards Island was named after John Edwards, a former owner of the site.

References

Landforms of Wood County, Wisconsin
River islands of Wisconsin